Matthias Schuke (born 7 July 1955) is a German organ builder.

Career 
Born in Potsdam, Schuke is the son of the organ builder Hans-Joachim Schuke. He attended the "Polytechnische Oberschule 24", now the Eisenhardtschule Potsdam, from 1962 and graduated with a high school diploma. From September 1972 to June 1974, he trained as a cabinetmaker at the Richard Praetsch carpentry workshop in Babelsberg.

In 1974, he began training as an organ builder in the "Volkseigener Betrieb" Potsdamer Schuke Orgelbau, went through the wood workshop, tin workshop, restoration and voicing departments and completed his training in 1977. During this time, Matthias Schuke also completed his Abitur at evening school. From 1977 to 1985 he worked mainly in the field and in voicing. In 1985, he began his training as a master organ builder. In 1988 he passed the master craftsman's examination. His masterpiece, a 4-register chest organ, stands today in the Erlöserkirche Potsdam.

In 1990, Schuke managed to successfully reprivatise the company in the course of the political and economic Peaceful Revolution. and has since been the owner and managing director of 

In 1998, he was awarded the Order of Merit of the Federal Republic of Germany in his capacity as a committed personality in German organ building.

In 2001, his company achieved 1st place in the Technology Transfer Prize of the Technology Foundation of the State of Brandenburg, together with the University of Potsdam. In addition, the company received the Professor Adalbert Seifriz Prize 2001, a nationwide craft prize from the Steinbeis Foundation in Stuttgart with Reimund Gerhard, University of Potsdam.

In 2003, Schuke decided to leave the old, too small workshop premises in the centre of Potsdam and to build a new company headquarters in Werder (Havel). In February 2004, the company moved into the new workshop premises. At the end of November 2017, he announced that he would gradually hand over the company to his sons Johannes (born 1985) and Michael (born 1989). The sons joined the company management in 2018.

During his time as managing director, Matthias Schuke and his company were able to realise major projects in the Erfurt Cathedral, the Zamora, Michoacán, in the Magdeburg Cathedral and in the Königsberg Cathedral.

References

Further reading 
 Alexander Schuke Potsdam Orgelbau GmbH: 100 Jahre Alexander Schuke Orgelbau in Potsdam. thomasius verlag – Thomas Helms, Schwerin 1994

External links 
  Alexander Schuke Potsdam Orgelbau GmbH, catalogue raisonné. (Memento 23 April 2004 im Internet Archive) The list contains all new constructions, alterations and repairs by Matthias Schuke, with details of the stops, manuals and pedals.

German pipe organ builders
Recipients of the Cross of the Order of Merit of the Federal Republic of Germany
1955 births
Living people
People from Potsdam